Agony in the Garden is a painting of Andrea Mantegna, conserved at the Musée des Beaux-Arts de Tours, dating from 1457–59.

Paintings by Andrea Mantegna
1450s paintings
Mantegna
Paintings in Tours
Angels in art
Rabbits and hares in art
Water in art
Paintings depicting Saint Peter